Matthew Dicus Capps (born September 3, 1983) is an American former professional baseball relief pitcher. He is a 2002 graduate of Alexander High School in Douglasville, Georgia, where he lettered in football, basketball, cross-country and baseball before receiving a scholarship to Louisiana State University. He has played in Major League Baseball (MLB) for the Pittsburgh Pirates, Washington Nationals and Minnesota Twins.

Early life
Capps was born in Douglasville, Georgia to Mike and Kathy Capps. Capps played high school baseball at Robert S. Alexander High School and signed a letter of intent to play college baseball at Louisiana State.

Professional career

Pittsburgh Pirates

Capps was drafted by the Pirates in the 7th round of the 2002 Major League Baseball Draft. He was a starting pitcher until 2004, never advancing above A-level in the minor leagues.

In 2005, he was converted to a relief pitcher and began to show signs of success. Though he started the season at A-level Hickory, he was promoted mid-season to the AA Altoona Curve and later to the AAA Indianapolis Indians for the International League playoffs. After Indianapolis's season ended, he was promoted to the Pirates on September 16 and made his debut that night.

The beginning of the 2006 season saw Capps break spring training with the Pirates. At first, Capps saw time only in safe situations, but, as the season wore on, he established himself as one of the most consistent and effective relievers in the Pittsburgh bullpen. Although only a rookie, Capps appeared many times as the Pirates' set-up man to closers Mike González and Salomón Torres.

In 85 games during the 2006 season, Capps pitched a total of 80.2 innings, striking out 56 batters, while only allowing 81 hits and 37 runs, for an ERA of 3.79. Capps posted a team best 9–1 record out of the bullpen, while mixing in 13 holds and 1 save. He led all Major League rookie pitchers in appearances.

Capps began the 2007 season as the sole eighth inning set-up man to Torres, and through the beginning of June was among Major League Baseball's leaders in holds. On June 1, manager Jim Tracy announced that Capps would replace Torres as the Pirates closer. One day later, Capps recorded his first save of the season—the second of his career. This was the first glimpse of his new role as the Pirates' closer.

Capps started the 2008 season by earning 15 consecutive saves, before blowing his first save of the season on June 10. On July 2, Capps was placed on the disabled list after suffering from arm soreness. He missed nearly two months of action while he rehabbed at the Pirates' spring training facility in Bradenton, Florida. He ended the season with 21 saves and five blown saves.

In 2009, Capps converted 27 of 32 save opportunities, with a 5.80 ERA. He allowed 73 hits and 35 earned runs in 54.1 innings pitched. Capps was not tendered a contract by the Pirates on December 12 and became a free agent.

Washington Nationals
On January 6, 2010, Capps signed a one-year, $3.5 million deal with the Washington Nationals. Capps was named the Delivery Man of the Month Award winner for April 2010, after recording ten saves in ten opportunities with an ERA of 0.68 for the month. He would convert his first 16 save opportunities of the season, en route to recording 23 saves in the season's opening half, good for a tie for second in the major leagues. He earned his first All-Star Game selection, voted in on the Player's Ballot. He was the leading vote-getter among all NL relievers.

Capps went on to be the winning pitcher in the game. The sixth hurler for the NL, he struck out the previous day's Home Run Derby winner David Ortiz looking with a 2–2 fastball to end the sixth inning, holding the American Leaguers to a 1–0 lead. He was the beneficiary of Brian McCann's three-run double in the seventh.

Minnesota Twins
On July 29, 2010, Capps was traded to the Minnesota Twins for catcher Wilson Ramos and left-handed pitcher Joe Testa. He took over the closer role from Jon Rauch and picked up his first save as a Twin in his first outing against the Seattle Mariners, on July 30. Through October 2, Capps was 2–0 with a 2.00 ERA for the Twins, with 16 saves in 18 opportunities. Upon the return of Joe Nathan, Capps was reassigned to the setup role for the 2011 season. After two blown saves in a row, Nathan relinquished the closer role to Capps on April 16. Capps again became a setup man for Nathan after a dramatic loss at Target Field on July 15, 2011.

In December 2011, Capps re-signed with the Twins. The contract guarantees at least one year and at least $4,750,000.

On October 24, 2012, the Twins announced they would decline their club option for Capps worth $6MM. Capps received a $250K buyout.

Cleveland Indians
On January 31, 2013, the Cleveland Indians announced they signed Capps to a minor league deal with an invitation to spring training. They subsequently released him on March 25. He was re-signed to another minor league contract a day later. He was assigned to Triple-A Columbus, where he pitched in 6 games before going on the disabled list with right shoulder inflammation. On June 5, he underwent surgery, ending his season. He gave up 1 run in 7 innings in those 6 games with Columbus, striking out 3.

On October 17, 2013, Capps signed another minor league deal with the Indians with an invitation to spring training.

Atlanta Braves
On February 10, 2015, the Atlanta Braves signed Capps to a minor-league contract with an invite to spring training. He was released on April 4.  The Braves resigned Capps to another minor league deal on April 6.  He was later released on May 2.

Arizona Diamondbacks
On February 29, 2016, Capps signed a minor league deal with the Arizona Diamondbacks. He became a free agent on November 7, 2016.

Pitching style
Capps throws five pitches: a four-seam fastball and two-seam fastball (91–95 mph), slider (85–89), and changeup splitter (87–89). Left-handed hitters see more two-seam fastballs and changeups, while righties see more four-seamers and sliders. On a handful of occasions, Capps has experimented with a cutter to right-handers.

Personal life
Capps is a Christian. Capps has spoken about his faith saying, "Baseball is our national pastime, and a lot of people look up to us because of what we do. To be able to use that and funnel that into sharing Christ is an unbelievable opportunity." He was baptized a Baptist at ten years old.

Starting with the 2021 season, Capps became a broadcaster for the Pittsburgh Pirates, splitting his time between radio and television.

References

External links

1983 births
Living people
Major League Baseball pitchers
Baseball players from Georgia (U.S. state)
Pittsburgh Pirates players
Washington Nationals players
Minnesota Twins players
Gulf Coast Pirates players
Lynchburg Hillcats players
Williamsport Crosscutters players
Hickory Crawdads players
Altoona Curve players
Indianapolis Indians players
Fort Myers Miracle players
Columbus Clippers players
People from Douglasville, Georgia
National League All-Stars
Arizona League Indians players
Sportspeople from the Atlanta metropolitan area
Major League Baseball broadcasters
Pittsburgh Pirates announcers